Mino Cinélu (born March 10, 1957) is a French musician. He plays multiple instruments. He is a composer, programmer and producer; and is most often associated primarily for his work as a jazz percussionist.

Biography
Cinelu was born in Saint-Cloud, Hauts-de-Seine. His father is from Martinique and his mother is French. He was involved with music from childhood as his father and two brothers were musicians, and started spending time and playing in various concert halls such as the Chapelle des Lombards in the suburbs of Paris. He became interested in various styles of music such as jazz, rock, salsa and even in more esoteric varieties like Egyptian chants and Romani music. He would later expand his repertoire to include fado, flamenco, African music, Japanese music, and Slavic music.

The first instrument that Cinelu took to was the bongo drums, which led him to decide to try and live from his music. He often played the bongos in the streets where he first experimented with improvisation. At the end of the 1970s he became more and more interested in the French jazz fusion scene where he made many connections with other musicians and members of the music industry. At varying times he worked with Jef Gilson, Chute Libre, and Moravagine. Shortly thereafter he began playing with artists such as Bernard Lavilliers, Colette Magny, Gong, and Toto Bissainthe.

In 1979, he moved to New York City. After a difficult start he met several musicians living in and around the city such as George Benson, Wayne Shorter, Kenny Barron, and Cassandra Wilson. He continued to learn new instruments in different contexts; for example he played the bass in a gospel choir and earned some money by giving drum lessons. In the beginning of the 1980s he met Miles Davis while playing in a soul band at the New York club Mikkel's. Miles offered him a job as percussionist in his group, playing alongside the group's drummer Al Foster. After a month of rehearsals, Cinelu went on tour with Miles Davis' band.

His stint with Miles Davis led to more recognition; during a concert at the Hollywood Bowl, Joe Zawinul contacted him to join Weather Report as percussionist, which he accepted. During this period he began composing music, with the help of Weather Report members Wayne Shorter and Joe Zawinul.

Cinelu also played with Michel Portal after Michel saw him play at the Théâtre du Châtelet with Miles Davis.

Starting in the 1990s, Cinelu began working on a solo career. His first solo album self-titled Mino Cinelu was released in 2000. Quest Journey was followed by La californie in 2006.

Discography

With Gong
Gazeuse! (1976)

With Pat Metheny Group
Imaginary Day (1997)

With Miles Davis
We Want Miles (1982)
Star People (1983)
Decoy (1984)
That's What Happened: Live in Germany 1987 (DVD, 1987)

With Weather Report
 Sportin' Life (1985, Columbia Records)
 This Is This! (1986, Columbia Records)

Solo career
World Trio (1995)
With Kevin Eubanks and Dave Holland
Mino Cinelu (2000)
With Moun Madinina
Quest Journey (2002)
California (2006)

With other artists
Eliane Elias – A Long Story (Manhattan, 1991)
Robin Eubanks - Karma (JMT, 1991)
Gil Evans - Live at Sweet Basil (Gramavision, 1984 [1986]), Live at Sweet Basil Vol. 2 (Gramavision, 1984 [1987])
Michel Portal - Turbulence, 1987
Sting - ...Nothing Like the Sun, 1987
Andy Summers - World Gone Strange, 1991
Roseanna Vitro - Reaching for the Moon (Chase Music Group, 1991); Softly (Concord Jazz, 1993); Tropical Postcards (A Records, 2004); Clarity: Music of Clare Fischer (Random Act Records, 2014)
Kenny Barron/Mino Cinelu - Swamp Sally, 1995
Christian McBride - Number Two Express, 1995
Kenny Barron - Sambao, 1992
Kenny Barron - Other Places, 1993
Kenny Barron - Things Unseen, 1997
Jacky Terrasson and Cassandra Wilson - Rendezvous (Blue Note, 1997)
Geri Allen - Open on All Sides in the Middle (Minor Music, 1987); The Gathering (Verve, 1998)
Jacky Terrasson - What It Is (Blue Note, 1999)
Alain Bashung - L'Imprudence, 2002
Layo & Bushwacka!/Mino Cinelu - Feels Closer, 2006
Serge Forté - Thanks for All, Ella Productions 2004
Anna Maria Jopek - Farat, 2003; Jo & Co, 2009
Jacques Coursil - Clameurs, 2007
Groove 55 - Voyage, 2012
Kate Bush - Before the Dawn'', 2016
Nils Petter Molvær - SulaMadiana, 2020

References

External links 

Mino Cinelu's website
Quest Journey Review of the Album 'Quest Journey'
Mino Cinelu Mino Cinelu MusiCodex Page

French musicians
People from Saint-Cloud
French percussionists
Jazz percussionists
Weather Report members
1957 births
Living people
Gong (band) members
Buckshot LeFonque members